Come Out Fighting is a short 1973 Australian feature directed by Nigel Buesst.

Plot
Aboriginal boxer Al Dawson is torn by the demands of fight promoters and aboriginal protestors. He eventually decides to reject them all and gives away his chance at a world title.

Cast
 Michael Karpaney as Al Dawson
 Joey Collins as Eddie
 Bethany Lee as Susan Parker
 Cliff Neate as Stan Harkness
 Peter Green as Rocky Garibaldi
 Bob Horsfall as Phil Bench
 Brian Torrens as Carl Price
 Peter Adams as Garry Day
 Martin Phelan as student
 Harry Williams as aboriginal drinker
 Max Pescud as trainer
 Bert Williams as aboriginal drinker
 Kris McQuade as Sporting World hostess
 John Jacobs as trainer
 John Duigan as student

Production
The film was shot on 16mm and was made with the assistance of the Experimental FIlm and Television Fund. Filming completed by July 1973.

References

External links
 Come Out Fighting at IMDb
 Come Out Fighting at Oz Movies
 Dylan Rainforth, 'Boxing on with Mao and Mundine: Come Out Fighting', Senses of Cinema, 19 May 2008

Australian drama films
1970s English-language films
1973 films
1973 drama films
Films directed by Nigel Buesst
Films about Aboriginal Australians